The 1872 North Carolina gubernatorial election was held on August 1, 1872. Incumbent Republican Tod Robinson Caldwell, who defeated Thomas Settle and Oliver H. Dockery for the Republican nomination, defeated Democratic nominee Augustus Summerfield Merrimon, who defeated James Madison Leach and Daniel Moreau Barringer for the Democratic nomination, with 50.49% of the vote.

General election

Candidates
Tod Robinson Caldwell, Republican
Augustus Summerfield Merrimon, Democratic

Results

References

1872
North Carolina
Gubernatorial